Danail Mitev (born 11 January 1984) is a Bulgarian footballer who currently plays as a forward for Mosta in the Maltese Premier League. He was raised in Beroe Stara Zagora's youth teams.

Career statistics

References

External links

1984 births
Living people
Bulgarian footballers
First Professional Football League (Bulgaria) players
Israeli Premier League players
PFC Beroe Stara Zagora players
FC Lokomotiv 1929 Sofia players
Bnei Sakhnin F.C. players
Sliema Wanderers F.C. players
Mosta F.C. players
Bulgarian expatriate footballers
Expatriate footballers in Israel
Expatriate footballers in Malta

Association football forwards
Sportspeople from Stara Zagora